Streetlife Serenade is the third studio album by American recording artist Billy Joel, released on October 11, 1974 by Columbia Records. 

The album peaked at No. 35 on the US album charts, eventually selling more than one million copies. Joel's live shows in the 1970s frequently featured the instrumental "Root Beer Rag" and the short song "Souvenir", which was often used as the final encore. Live versions of "Streetlife Serenader" and "Los Angelenos" appeared on Joel's first live album, Songs in the Attic (1981). A live version of "The Entertainer" appeared on Joel's 2006 album 12 Gardens Live.

Background
It was recorded mostly with session musicians—the last such release until 1993's River of Dreams. Joel sang and played piano and other keyboards, including his first work with the Moog synthesizer. Backing musicians included guitarists Don Evans and Al Hertzberg and banjo/pedal steel guitarist Tom Whitehorse. 

Joel said that he had been touring in clubs and theatres and opening for big acts such as The Beach Boys, thus leaving him little time to write new songs, but he was under pressure to put out a new album after Piano Man. He also says that he did not have many new songs, hence the inclusion of the instrumentals "Root Beer Rag" and "The Mexican Connection". The back cover features a barefooted Joel sitting in a chair looking cross; Joel says that he had had his wisdom teeth extracted two days before the shoot. The front cover is a painting by Brian Hagiwara of a hotel and café located at 651 South Centre Street in Los Angeles, California.

In a retrospective interview, Joel said of the album: "Interesting musical ideas, but nothing to say lyrically. I was trying to be Debussy in the title track — it didn’t work."

Release history
In addition to the usual two-channel stereo version, the album was also released by Columbia in a four-channel quadraphonic mix on LP record and 8-track tape in 1974. The quad LP release was encoded in the SQ matrix system. In 2015, the album was re-issued by Audio Fidelity in the Super Audio CD format containing both the complete stereo and quadraphonic mixes.

Track listing 
All tracks written and composed by Billy Joel.

One side (Side one)
"Streetlife Serenader" – 5:17
"Los Angelenos" – 3:41
"The Great Suburban Showdown" – 3:44
"Root Beer Rag" (Instrumental) – 2:59
"Roberta" – 4:32

Another side (Side two)
"The Entertainer" – 3:48
"Last of the Big Time Spenders" – 4:34
"Weekend Song" – 3:29
"Souvenir" – 2:00
"The Mexican Connection" (Instrumental) – 3:37

Personnel 

 Billy Joel – vocals, acoustic piano, keyboards, Moog synthesizer, arrangements
 William "Smitty" Smith – organ
 Richard Bennett – guitars
 Gary Dalton – guitars
 Mike Deasy – guitars
 Don Evans – guitars
 Al Hertzberg – guitars
 Art Munson – guitars
 Raj Rathor – guitars
 Michael Stewart – guitars, arrangements 
 Tom Whitehorse – banjo, pedal steel guitar
 Wilton Felder – bass 
 Emory Gordy Jr. – bass
 Larry Knechtel – bass
 Ron Tutt – drums
 Joe Clayton – congas, percussion

Production 
 Michael Stewart – producer
 Ron Malo – engineer
 Joseph M. Palmaccio (erroneously credited to Ted Jensen) – 1998 CD digital remastering
 John Naatjes – tape research
 Ron Coro – art direction, design
 Brian Hagiwara –cover painting
 Peter Cunningham – photography
 Jim Marshall – photography

Charts

Weekly charts

Certifications

References 

1974 albums
Billy Joel albums
Columbia Records albums
Albums produced by Michael Stewart (musician)